Splošno slovensko žensko društvo was a Slovenian organisation for women's rights, founded in 1901 and discontinued in 1945.  It was the first women's rights organisation in Slovenia.

Its purpose was to work for women's access to higher education and professional work, but also for women's suffrage.

References

Organizations established in 1901
1901 establishments in Austria-Hungary
Women's rights organizations
Women's organizations based in Slovenia
Voter rights and suffrage organizations
Women's rights in Slovenia